The Badminton World Federation (BWF) is the international governing body for the sport of badminton recognised by the International Olympic Committee (IOC). It was founded in 1934 as the International Badminton Federation (IBF) with nine member nations (Canada, Denmark, England, France, Ireland, Netherlands, New Zealand, Scotland and Wales).  In 1981 the IBF merged with the World Badminton Federation, and on 24 September 2006, at the Extraordinary General Meeting in Madrid, the name of the organization was changed to Badminton World Federation (BWF).

When the BWF was founded (as the IBF), its head office was located in Cheltenham, UK. The head office was relocated to Kuala Lumpur, Malaysia on October 1, 2005. Poul-Erik Høyer Larsen is the current president. The BWF currently has 176 member nations around the world, organized into 5 continental confederations.

Continental federations

The BWF works in co-operation with regional governing bodies to promote and develop the sport of badminton around the world, they are:

Presidents
Below is the list of presidents since 1934:

Rankings

The BWF World Ranking and BWF World Junior Ranking are introduced to determine the strength of the players. BWF World Ranking is used for determining the qualification for entry and seeding for the BWF-sanctioned tournament. The points awarded is based on the final results of each tournament participated for the past 52 weeks. Junior Ranking consists of players under 19 years old.

Tournaments

Grade 1
The BWF regularly organises seven major international badminton events and two events for para-badminton:

Major tournaments:
 World Championships
 Thomas Cup
 Uber Cup
 Sudirman Cup
 Olympic Games in co-operation with International Olympic Committee

Other major tournaments:
 World Junior Championships
 BWF World Senior Championships

Para major tournaments:
 Para-Badminton World Championships
Paralympic Games in co-operation with International Paralympic Committee (sports added since Tokyo 2020 Paralympic Games)

Event(s) are no longer held regularly:
 World Cup was suspended since 1997. However, the BWF revived the event in 2005 (with China as host) but only as an invitational tournament. China swept gold in all 5 categories.

Grade 2
Grade 2 tournaments, known as BWF World Tour was sanctioned into six levels with different world ranking points awarded, as order they are:
 Level 1: BWF World Tour Finals
 Level 2: BWF World Tour Super 1000
 Level 3: BWF World Tour Super 750
 Level 4: BWF World Tour Super 500
 Level 5: BWF World Tour Super 300
 Level 6: BWF Tour Super 100

The events that were formerly held from 2007 to 2017 are:
 Super Series Premier
 Super Series
 Grand Prix Gold
 Grand Prix

Grade 3
Grade 3 tournaments, known as Continental Circuit was sanctioned into three levels with different world ranking points awarded, as order they are:
 International Challenge
 International Series
 Future Series

Awards
The BWF bestows special honours onto players, umpires, sponsors, and other individuals for their achievement in badminton or for their contributions to badminton.
 Lifetime Achievement
 Hall of Fame
 Herbert Scheele Trophy
 Distinguished Service
 Meritorius Service
 Certificate of Commendation
 Eddy Choong Player of the Year (hiatus since 2008)
 Best Male and Female Player of the Year
 Eddy Choong Most Promising Player of the Year
 Women in Badminton

Logo
Over the years, the organization has had several logos.  Originally it used the IBF logo.  As the BWF, a new logo was adopted in 2007. In 2012 it adopted a new, streamlined logo.

Publications
 World Badminton (Journal)
 The IBF Handbook

Social media 

 Youtube

Instagram

Facebook

Weibo

Twitter

See also
 BWF World Ranking
 World Badminton Federation (merged with the IBF in 1981)

References

External links
 Official website
 BWF Corporate
 BWF Tournament Software

 
International organisations based in Malaysia
Organisations based in Cheltenham
IOC-recognised international federations
Badminton organizations
Sports organizations established in 1934